Eric Clifton "Ricky" Marsh (born March 10, 1954) is a retired American professional basketball player. He played a total of 60 National Basketball Association (NBA) games.

In 2006, Ricky Marsh was inducted into the Manhattan College Athletic Hall of Fame. "Ricky Marsh ’77 Enjoyed an outstanding two-year career at Manhattan after transferring from Nebraska. A Dean’s List student, Marsh was named All-Metropolitan as a junior. While serving as a co-captain as a senior, he received the Doc Sweeney Award as MVP of the annual game with Fordham, and was selected to play in the Big Apple Classic. Drafted by the Golden State Warriors in the eighth round of the 1977 NBA Draft, Marsh started 50 of the 60 games he appeared in and leads all Jaspers in games played in the NBA."

References 

1954 births
Living people
American men's basketball players
Basketball players from New York City
Golden State Warriors draft picks
Golden State Warriors players
Manhattan Jaspers basketball players
Nebraska Cornhuskers men's basketball players
Shooting guards